Frederick George Bailey (24 February 1924 – 8 July 2020), who published professionally as F. G. Bailey, was a British social anthropologist who spent the second half of his career in the United States at the  University of California, San Diego (UCSD). He received his Ph.D. in social anthropology from Manchester University, working under Max Gluckman, and is closely associated with the Manchester School of social anthropology. A prolific writer of some sixteen books in anthropology, he is probably best known for his studies of local and organizational politics. He conducted fieldwork in Bisipāra, Orissa, India, and has also written on political functions, particularly the ways that social structure arises out of and is used by the interactions of individuals.

In 1956, Bailey joined the School of Oriental and African Studies (SOAS) as a lecturer and then a reader. In 1964 he moved to the new anthropology department at the University of Sussex.

He was elected a Fellow of the American Academy of Arts and Sciences in 1976 At the time he was a professor at the University of Sussex. He moved to San Diego, California in 1971 as part of the core faculty of the newly established department of anthropology at the University of California, San Diego, where he taught until retiring in 1997.

Bailey continued to write and publish anthropological books for another decade after his official retirement. He died in July 2020 at the age of 96.

Selected books
 Bailey, F. G. (1957) Caste and the Economic Frontier: a village in highland Orissa. Manchester: Manchester University Press.
 -- (1960) Tribe, caste, and nation: a study of political activity and political change in highland Orissa. Manchester, UK: Manchester University Press.
 -- (1963) Politics and Social Change: Orissa in 1959. Berkeley, CA: University of California Press. . 
 -- (1969) Stratagems and spoils: a social anthropology of politics. Oxford: Basil Blackwell.
 -- (1971) Gifts and Poisons: the politics of reputation. New York: Schocken Books.
 -- (1973) Debate and Compromise: The Politics of Innovation. Lanham, MD: Rowman & Littlefield Publishers. . 
 -- (1977) Morality and Expediency: the folklore of academic politics. Oxford, UK: Basil Blackwell.
 -- (1983) The Tactical Uses of Passion : An Essay on Power, Reason and Reality. Ithaca, NY: Cornell University Press. 
 -- (1988) Humbuggery and Manipulation: the art of leadership. Ithaca, NY: Cornell University Press.
 -- (1991) The Prevalence of Deceit. Ithaca, NY: Cornell University Press.
 -- (1993) The Kingdom of Individuals: an essay on self-respect and social obligation. Ithaca, NY: Cornell University Press.
 -- (1994) The Witch-Hunt, or, The triumph of morality. Ithaca, NY: Cornell University Press.
 -- (1996) The Civility of Indifference: on Domesticating Ethnicity. Ithaca, NY: Cornell University Press.  
 -- (1998) The Need for Enemies: A Bestiary of Political Forms. Ithaca, NY: Cornell University Press. . 
 -- (2001) Treasons, Stratagems, and Spoils. How Leaders Make Practical Use of Beliefs and Values. Boulder, CO: Westview Press.
 -- (2003) The Saving Lie: Truth & Method in the Social Sciences. Philadelphia, PA: University of Pennsylvania Press. . 
 -- (2008) God-Botherers and Other True Believers: Religion, Diseducation, and Politics. New York, NY: Berghahn Books. .

Selected articles and book chapters
 Bailey, F. G. (1963) "Capital, Saving and Credit in Highland Orissa", Ch 6 in Firth, Raymond, ed. Capital, Saving and Credit in Peasant Societies: Studies From Asia, Oceania, The Caribbean and Middle America. Chicago: Aldine Publishing. 
 -- (1978) "Tertius Gaudens aut Tertium Numen." In Scale and Social Organization. F. Barth, ed. Oslo: Universitetforlget.

References

Further reading 

 Barrett, Stanley R, (2020). “Politics as Theatrical Performance and Backstage Pragmatism: Work and Legacy of F. G. Bailey”, in BEROSE -  International Encyclopaedia of the Histories of Anthropology, Paris.

External links 

 Resources related to research : BEROSE - International Encyclopaedia of the Histories of Anthropology. "Bailey, Frederick George (1924- )", Paris, 2020.
 Archive papers including field notes, photographs and maps relating to F G Bailey and his work have been digitised by SOAS Special Collections and can be viewed online here.

1924 births
2020 deaths
Anthropology writers
Anthropology educators
Bailey, F. G.
Fellows of the American Academy of Arts and Sciences
Bailey, F. G.
University of California, San Diego faculty
British expatriates in the United States